M. H. Jayaprakashanarayan was a Member of the legislative assembly (1926–1995) from Sirsi constituency to the Karnataka state, Bangalore. Then Veerendra Patil was the Chief Minister of the Karnataka state. He is the founder of Panchajanya Vidhyapeeta Welfare Trust.

He was a sitting MLA from Yelhanka constituency.

After his demise the trust is managed by members unconnected to the family of JP. He is fondly remembered on 21 December every year on his birthday.

References
 Election Commission of India Statistical report - 1967 Karnataka state assembly elections

Kannada people
Mysore MLAs 1967–1972
Mysore MLAs 1972–1977
Praja Socialist Party politicians
Indian National Congress politicians from Karnataka